Granaria frumentum is a species of air-breathing land snail, a terrestrial pulmonate gastropod mollusk in the family Chondrinidae.

Granaria frumentum is the type species of genus Granaria.

Distribution 
Distribution of this species is central-European and southern-European.

 Czech Republic - near threatened (NT)
 Poland - critically endangered (CR)
 Slovakia
 Ukraine
 and others

References

Chondrinidae
Molluscs of Europe
Gastropods described in 1801